Eduardo Deboni (born 24 September 1981 in Erechim) is a Brazilian competitive swimmer. Integrated the Brazilian national delegation in 2008 Summer Olympics in Beijing, China, as a reserve.

He was at the 2007 World Aquatics Championships, in Melbourne where he helped the 4×100-metre freestyle relay of Brazil to qualify for the final.

At the 2007 Pan American Games, in Rio de Janeiro, he won a gold medal in the 4×100-metre freestyle (beating the South American and Pan American records, with a time of 3:15.90, along with Fernando Silva, Nicolas Oliveira and César Cielo), silver in the 4×100-metre medley (by having participated in heats)  and 4th place in the 100-metre freestyle.

Participating in the 2008 FINA World Swimming Championships (25 m), in Manchester, reached the 4×100-metre freestyle final, finishing in 8th place. also helped the 4×100-metre medley to go to the final  beating the South American record with a time of 3:29.74, along with Guilherme Guido Felipe França and Lucas Salatta; ranked 25th in the 50-metre freestyle, and 28th in the 100-metre freestyle.

References

External links 
 

1981 births
Living people
People from Erechim
Swimmers at the 2007 Pan American Games
Brazilian male freestyle swimmers
Pan American Games medalists in swimming
Pan American Games gold medalists for Brazil
Pan American Games silver medalists for Brazil
Medalists at the 2007 Pan American Games
Sportspeople from Rio Grande do Sul
20th-century Brazilian people
21st-century Brazilian people